The Dormition and Assumption of the Virgin is a tempera painting created by Elias Moskos. Moskos was a representative of the Late Cretan School and the Heptanese School.  He migrated to Zakinthos from Crete.  He was originally from the city of Rethymno.  He participated in the transition of Greek painting from the Cretan School to the more refined Heptanese School of the Ionian islands.  He also taught painting.  His activity was from 1645 to 1687. He was active on the islands of Crete, Zakynthos, and Kefalonia.  He was heavily involved with church committees.  Church committees commissioned paintings.  Half of his works were signed fifty-two of his works survived.  

The Dormition and Assumption of the Virgin was a popular theme painted by both Greek and Italian artists since the dawn of the new religion.  The chronology of the New Testament states that
Mary lived for 11 years after the death of Jesus, dying in AD 41 according to Hippolytus of Thebes.  The  sanhedrin feared that her body would disappear.  According to the Greek Rite she arouse after the third day.  She was resurrected.  The work of art is a testimony to the event.  Proto-Renaissance painter Fra Angelico completed a version of the theme around 1432 called Death and the Assumption of the Virgin.  Greek painters employed a common technique during the early Cretan School following the traditional lines of Greek Italian Byzantine painting.  Andreas Ritzos completed a version of the work during the second half of the 15th century.  During the 16th century, El Greco completed a similar version called Dormition of the Virgin.  In the 17th century, one of Mosko's contemporaries Victor also finished a similar painting.  Mosko's work escaped the traditional confinement of the early Cretan School.  His work features complex qualities not existent in earlier versions.  The work of art is part of the collection of the Byzantine and Christian Museum.

History
The work of art was completed in 1679 on the island of Zakynthos.  The materials used were tempera and gold leaf on a wood panel.  The height of the work was 37.4 in. (94.9 cm) and the width 18.5 in. (46.9 cm).  The work was completed nine years before the artist's death.  The work of art is an example of the craftsmanship of the late Cretan School.  The painter employs more modernistic techniques on the wood panel.  The artist presents a foreground, middle ground, and background.  The work is comparable to Proto-Renaissance paintings.  The Death and the Assumption of the Virgin is a similar work completed by Fra Angelico around 1432.  Andreas Ritzo's early Cretan painting is also very similar to Mosko's work.  El Greco's work Dormition of the Virgin is also in-line with Mosko's icon.  All five works are in the same style. 

In the foreground, two figures appear kneeling in front of the dead heavenly mother.  The figure on our left grabs the holy surface on which the Virgin rests.  His name was 
Iefonia (Ιεφονία). He was a sanhedrin priest who tried to disturb the body of the Virgin Mary.  The sanhedrin feared the disappearance of her body and her resurrection.  The painting is a testimony of her resurrection.  To Iefonia’s left, an angel wields a sword stopping Iefonia.  The candle stand between them establishes the space.  The area the Virgin rests on is covered with a brilliantly painted curtain-like cloth with clear lines and folds of fabric.  The figure to our left-right over the Virgin's head holds a thymiaterion.  The entire group around her statuesque figure is grieving.  A priest appears to our left next to Jesus reading from a sacred book.      

Jesus appears holding Lazarus a symbol of the resurrection.  Surrounding Jesus a magnificent aura of angels appears in ghostly form headed by a seraphim.  Behind the funeral, a spectacular group of buildings appears.  The architecture is far more evolved than in earlier works.  The artists adequately defined the space.  Behind the buildings, a mountainous landscape appears in the background.  In the upper portion of the work.  The Virgin is floating on a cloud surrounded by angles.  A beam of light appears behind her.  Clouds appear to her left and right filled with figures.  The divine Virgin appears featuring a heavenly majestic exalted pose wearing her traditional garments.  She is holding the holy belt.  Saint Thomas the Apostle appears on a cloud-ready to receive the belt.

Gallery

References

Bibliography 

17th-century paintings
Cretan Renaissance paintings